Jean-Charles Cirilli (born September 10, 1982 in Saint-Étienne) is a French professional football player. Currently, he plays in the Championnat National for Fréjus Saint-Raphaël.

1982 births
Living people
French footballers
Ligue 1 players
Ligue 2 players
Championnat National players
OGC Nice players
Nîmes Olympique players
AS Cannes players
AC Arlésien players
Amiens SC players
ÉFC Fréjus Saint-Raphaël players
Le Puy Foot 43 Auvergne players
Footballers from Saint-Étienne
Association football defenders